Nedurumalli Janardhana Reddy (20 February 1935 – 9 May 2014) was an Indian politician from Andhra Pradesh. A member of the Indian National Congress, he represented the Visakhapatnam constituency in the Lok Sabha, the lower house of the Indian legislature. From 1990 to 1992, he served as chief minister of Andhra Pradesh. His wife, Nedurumalli Rajyalakshmi, was a minister in the Government of Andhra Pradesh between 2004 and 2014. 

In September 2007, members of the militant Naxal group attempted to assassinate Reddy and his wife; both escaped unharmed.

Life and career 

Reddy was born in Vakadu on 20 February 1935. After completing his education, he briefly worked as a teacher in a Vakadu school. He entered politics in 1972 and was elected to the Rajya Sabha. In 1978, he became the general secretary of the state congress, he was later elected to the Legislative Council. In his five-decade political career, he also served as a state minister and a legislator. He is the first who laid the foundation stone for Hitech  City(Cyber Towers) in Madhapur, Hyderabad. Reddy worked until 1983 in Andhra Pradesh state government, serving as a minister in cabinets headed by Chief Ministers T. Anjaiah, Bhavanam Venkatram, and Kotla Vijayabhaskara Reddy.  He was elected to Lok Sabha thrice, one each from the Bapatla (1998), Narsaraopet (1999) and Visakhapatnam (2004) constituencies.
He represented Visakhapatnam as a congress member, and he served as President of the Andhra Pradesh Congress Committee in 1988. He joined Channa Reddy's cabinet in 1989, serving as Revenue Minister.

After Reddy quit the position of Chief Minister, Janardhan Reddy succeeded him, ascending to the Chief Ministership in 1990. Communal riots in Hyderabad presented a challenge; Reddy was credited with bringing law and order to the region in a short time. He was the first Chief Minister to ban the militant Naxalite People's War Group. One important decision during his career was the privatization of professional education. Many medical and engineering colleges in the private sector were permitted to operate during his tenure. Kotla Vijayabhaskara Reddy succeeded him as Chief Minister in October 1992. Members of the Naxalite extremist group, which Reddy had earlier outlawed, attempted to assassinate him on September 7, 2007. The attempt occurred while he was travelling with his family to his home village of Vakadu. Although three of his followers died in the incident, Reddy and his wife escaped unharmed. Reddy was elected to the Rajya Sabha again in 2010, where he served until his death. In his final years, Reddy suffered from a liver ailment and Parkinson's disease. He died in 2014 after prolonged illness, survived by his wife Rajyalaxmi and his four sons.

Political history 

 1972–1978 : Member of Rajya sabha.
 1978–1984 : MLC.
 1978–1983 : Cabinet Minister for Revenue, Industries, Power and Agriculture Departments in the Government of Andhra Pradesh.
 1988–1989 : P.C.C. President.
 1989–1994 : MLA of Venkatagiri (Assembly constituency).
 1989–1990 : Cabinet Minister for Agriculture, Forests and Higher Education Departments in the Government of Andhra Pradesh.
 1990–1992 : Chief Minister of Andhra Pradesh.
 1998–1999 : MP (Bapatla – 12th Lok Sabha).
 1999–2004 : MP (Narasaraopet – 13th Lok Sabha – 2nd term).
 2004–2009 : MP (Visakhapatnam – 14th Lok Sabha – 3rd term).
 2009 : Elected to Rajya Sabha.
 2010 : Re-elected to Rajya Sabha.

See also
 List of Chief Ministers of Andhra Pradesh
 Government of Andhra Pradesh
 Politics of Andhra Pradesh

References

External links 

1935 births
2014 deaths
Indian National Congress politicians from Andhra Pradesh
Chief Ministers of Andhra Pradesh
India MPs 1998–1999
India MPs 2004–2009
Telugu politicians
India MPs 1999–2004
Rajya Sabha members from Andhra Pradesh
People from Nellore
Politicians from Nellore district
Lok Sabha members from Andhra Pradesh
Chief ministers from Indian National Congress
Andhra Pradesh MLAs 1985–1989
Andhra Pradesh MLAs 1989–1994